"Musta Had a Good Time" is a song recorded by American country music group Parmalee. It was released in July 2012 as their debut single and the first from their album Feels Like Carolina. The song was written by group members Matt Thomas, Scott Thomas, Josh McSwain, and Barry Knox, along with David Fanning.

Critical reception
Billy Dukes of Taste of Country gave the song a two-star review, saying that "It’s not that country and rock haven’t been fused before — Jason Aldean has made a career of it. There’s an art to creating that mix, however. An inexperienced hand leaves the parts lying across the table, instead of blending seamlessly into a satisfying wall of sound."

Music video
The music video was directed by Wes Edwards and premiered in August 2012.

Chart performance

References 

2012 songs
2012 debut singles
Parmalee songs
BBR Music Group singles
Song recordings produced by New Voice Entertainment
Music videos directed by Wes Edwards
Songs written by David Fanning (singer)